Guillermo Huerta Huitrón (born July 3, 1966, in Mexico City) is a Mexican football manager and former player.

He played primarily the technical assist position. He managed Atlético Zacatepec during the 2013–14 Ascenso MX season.

External links

1966 births
Living people
Mexican football managers
Mexican footballers
Footballers from Mexico City
Association footballers not categorized by position